Lae Airport is a public use airport at Lae on Lae Atoll, Marshall Islands.

Airlines and destinations

References

Airports in the Marshall Islands